The Pavilion is the second largest shopping centre located in Westville near Durban and one of the largest in South Africa. The mall has gone through many phases of extensions.

History
The mall was developed in the early 90s and opened in October 1993 by Murray and Roberts, (now Concor), to initially provide  of shopping space.  Subsequently, the centre has gone through six phases of expansion, the most recent of which was completed in 2014, bringing the floor space to just under . An additional  expansion is planned for 2018.

References

Shopping centres in Durban
Shopping malls established in 1993